Campages is a genus of brachiopods belonging to the family Dallinidae.

The species of this genus are found in Malesia and Australia.

Species:

Campages asthenia 
Campages dubius 
Campages furcifera 
Campages japonica 
Campages mariae 
Campages nipponensis 
Campages ovalis 
Campages pacifica

References

Brachiopod genera